Conflict was originally slated to be built to the Sampson designed steam vessel rated as a Steam Vessel First Class (SV1); however, the Admiralty, first rerated the vessels as First Class Sloops on 19 April 1845 then on 9 May 1845, she was ordered from a design of Sir William Symonds,Surveyor of the Navy. Originally designated as 10-gun vessels with 400 NHP engines. She served in the Baltic during the Russian war of 1854 - 55. She was sold for breaking in 1863.

Conflict was the fourth named vessel since its introduction for a 12-gun gun brig launched by Dudman at Deptford on 17 April 1801 and wrecked on the French Coast on 24 October 1804.

Construction
Her keel was laid in July 1845 at HM Royal Dockyard, Pembroke, and launched on 5 August 1846. She was towed to Wigram's Yard, Blackwall, London to be lengthened in early 1848. The lengthening was to facilitate the installation of her propeller. During trials Conflict's engine generated  for a speed of 9.378 knots. Conflict was completed for sea on 20 November 1849 at a cost of: Hull – £20,496; machinery – £21,514; lengthening – £5,410; and fitting – £11,088.

Commissioned Service

First Commission
Her first commission was on 4 October 1849 at Plymouth under Commander Thomas G. Drake, RN for service on the East Coast Of South America. She changed commanders to Acting Commander Robert Jenner, RN on 15 December 1851 before returning to Home Waters and paying off at Portsmouth on 4 June 1852.

Second Commission
She recommissioned at Plymouth for service in the Baltic during the Russian War on 25 February 1854 under Captain John Foote, RN. Captain John Foote, was drowned off Memel (now Klaipėda in Lithuania) on 18 April 1854. Commander Arthur Cumming, RN took command on 19 April. She was involved in the actions at Liepaja and Riga. On 7 February 1855 Commander Stephen S.L. Crofton took Command. On 16 March 1855 Commander Francis T. Brown, RN took command. She returned to Devonport in June 1855. On 9 July 1855 she was under the command of Commander William Charles Chamberlain, RN. On 21 February 1856 she was under commad of Commander Thomas Cochrane, RN preparing for deployment to the Mediterranean Station. She returned to Home Waters, paying off at Plymouth on 24 February 1857.

Third Commission
Her last commission started on 29 August 1857 under Commander Richard W. Courtenay, RN for service on the West Coast of Africa. She returned to Home Waters at the end of 1859.

Disposition
Upon her arrival in Home Waters, she paid off at Plymouth on 13 December 1859. She was sold in 1863.

HMS Conflict was awarded the Battle Honour Baltic 1854 – 55.

Notes

References

Rif Winfield; British Warships in the Age of Sail (1817 - 1863): published by Seaforth Publishing, England (c) 2014; eISBN 9781473837430
Navy List, HM Stationay Office, London
The Victorian Navy, William N. Looney, Conflict

Ships built in Pembroke Dock
Victorian-era sloops of the United Kingdom
Sloops of the Royal Navy
Sloop classes